Palaeopsyche is a genus of moths in the family Epipyropidae. It consists of only one species Palaeopsyche melanias, which is found in the wet tropics of Queensland.

The wingspan is 7-8.5 mm. The forewings are purple-tinged dull black. The hindwings are greyish tinged dark fuscous.

The larvae feed on planthoppers of the superfamily Fulgoroidea.

References

Epipyropidae
Monotypic moth genera
Zygaenoidea genera
Moths of Australia